Chandan Ray (born 12 August 2001) is an Indian cricketer. He made his Twenty20 debut on 10 January 2021, for Tripura in the 2020–21 Syed Mushtaq Ali Trophy.

References

External links
 

2001 births
Living people
Indian cricketers
Tripura cricketers
Place of birth missing (living people)